Rebel Roy Steiner, Sr. (August 17, 1927 – October 18, 2014) was an American football player who played offensive end for the University of Alabama football team, including the 1945 squad known as the "War Babies," who went undefeated before beating USC in Alabama's last appearance in the 1946 Rose Bowl. He also played basketball and baseball for the Tide. Steiner was drafted by the Chicago Bears but was called into military service in 1946. He played football with the U.S. Army’s 1st Cavalry Division in Tokyo before returning to play with the Tide. Steiner played defensive back for the Green Bay Packers in 1950 and 1951 and intercepted 10 passes during his brief career. One of the interceptions was a 94-yard touchdown return that stood as a Green Bay record for 34 years. A knee injury ended Steiner’s tenure at Green Bay. He went on to play semi-pro baseball. Following his athletic career, Steiner worked for the R.L. Zeigler, Inc. meatpacking company.

References

1927 births
2014 deaths
Players of American football from Birmingham, Alabama
American football defensive backs
Alabama Crimson Tide football players
Green Bay Packers players